Azita Sahebjam is the director of Vancouver Pars National Ballet. She also acted in the movie The Neighbor directed by Naghmeh Shirkhan.

References

External links
 An Iranian Canadian folklore dance company

Ballet teachers
Iranian women dancers
Iranian emigrants to Canada
Canadian ballerinas
Year of birth missing (living people)
Living people